Elnes Station is an abandoned railway station on the Gjøvik Line at  in Lunner, Norway. The station opened in 1932. After NSB Gjøvikbanen took over operations of the line on 11 June 2006, services to the station were terminated and it was closed.

External links 
 Entry at the Norwegian National Rail Administration 
 Entry at the Norwegian Railway Club 

Railway stations in Nittedal
Railway stations on the Gjøvik Line
Railway stations opened in 1932
Railway stations closed in 2006
Disused railway stations in Norway
1932 establishments in Norway
2006 disestablishments in Norway